Eunidia simplex is a species of beetle in the family Cerambycidae. It was described by Charles Joseph Gahan in 1890.

References

Eunidiini
Beetles described in 1890
Taxa named by Charles Joseph Gahan